The ARY Film Award for Best Background Score is an ARY Film Award that is awarded each year to the best background music that is substantial body of music in the form of dramatic underscoring written specifically for the film by the submitting composer. It is one of eleven Technical Awarding category.

History
The Best Background Score category originates with the 1st ARY Film Awards ceremony since 2014. This category has been given to the best Background Scor Composer for his/her work for the films of previous year to the ceremony held by Jury selection.

Winners and nominees 

As of 2014, No nominations were made, winner selection and nomination were wholly made by AFAS Jury of Technical award.

2010s

References

External links 

 

ARY Film Award winners
ARY Film Awards